The Department of Cultural Affairs, Taipei City Government (DOCA) is a governmental department of Taipei City Government of Taiwan established in November 1999.

Organisations 
The department oversees the following organisations:
Taipei Fine Arts Museum
Taipei Symphony Orchestra 
Taipei City Archives
Taipei Chinese Orchestra 
Taipei City Arts Promotion Office
Taipei Zhongshan Hall
Taipei Music Center

See also
 Taipei City Government

References 

1999 establishments in Taiwan
Government of Taipei